Ben Austin (born 1980) is an Australian athlete.

Benjamin or Ben Austin may also refer to:

Ben Austin (sailor) (born 1982), Australian sailor
Benjamin Fish Austin (1850–1933), Canadian educator, Methodist minister, and spiritualist
Benjamin H. Austin (1832–1885), Justice of the Territorial Supreme Court of Hawaii

See also
Benjamin Austen, see Austen Henry Layard